Breedon Cement, formerly Hope Construction Materials and later Hope Cement, is a producer of cement, concrete and aggregates in the United Kingdom, founded on 7 January 2013 by entrepreneur Amit Bhatia. Before 1 April 2014, Hope Construction Materials was the trading name for the two entities, Hope Cement Limited and Hope Ready Mix Concrete Limited. The company adopted its current name in 2017.

Hope Construction Materials was acquired by Breedon Group on 1 August 2016 for £336 million, and renamed Hope Cement Limited. Hope Ready Mix Concrete Limited remains a dormant company. Breedon has assets including Hope Cement Works, the largest cement plant in the United Kingdom at Hope, Derbyshire, and a network of 170 ready-mix concrete plants, as well as aggregate extraction and logistics operations.

History
In February 2011, cement company Lafarge and mining company Anglo American agreed to merge their British construction materials businesses. The deal was set to combine Anglo American's Tarmac UK unit, employing 4,500 people, with Lafarge's cement, concrete and aggregate quarries, depots and terminals. 

Due to the size of the venture, the Office of Fair Trading referred it to the UK's Competition Commission, who concluded in May 2012 that, because of the potential loss of competition in the aggregates, asphalt, cement and ready-mix concrete markets, some of their assets should be sold.

In November 2012, Lafarge and Anglo American agreed to sell ~£200 million worth of British assets to Amit Bhatia. In December of that year, Anglo American's Tarmac unit became Hope Ready Mixed Concrete Limited, whilst Lafarge's assets became Hope Cement Limited. The deal was completed in January 2013 with the creation of Hope Construction Materials.

The two firms, Hope Cement Limited, and Hope Ready Mixed Concrete Limited, traded under the name Hope Construction Materials; the two entities merged on 1 April 2014, creating Hope Construction Materials Limited.

On 18 November 2015, Breedon Aggregates announced the acquisition of Hope Construction Materials for £336 million, and completed the deal on 1 August 2016 following approval from the Competition and Markets Authority. The combination of Hope and Breedon created the largest independent construction materials business in the United Kingdom.

Operations
When the two Hope legal entities merged in 2014, the combined assets included a cement works at Hope, Derbyshire, which is the largest in the United Kingdom. The company also operated 170 ready-mix concrete plants; and a number of aggregate operations including quarries, rail terminals and shipping wharves. The company employed eight hundred people in January 2013. 

Production at Hope Cement works in its first year of trading (to 2014) was over 1.3 million tonnes of cement per year.

Railway 

When G & T Earle opened Earle's Cement works in 1929, it was linked to the Hope Valley Line by a  single track railway, which was worked by steam until 1963. Most of the cement now travels over it in trains hauled by class 20 locomotives to Earle's Sidings, where it is taken over by Freightliner.

References

External links
 
 YouTube video at Earles Sidings

British companies established in 2013
Wholesalers of the United Kingdom
Building materials companies of the United Kingdom